Alfred Schweizer (born 4 November 1941) is a Swiss composer.

Life 
Schweizer was born in Sevelen. After obtaining his Matura in Solothurn, he studied musicology with Arnold Geering and Lucie Dikenmann-Balmer and languages at the University of Bern. From 1963 to 1966, he received practical musical training with Sándor Veress and Theo Hirsbrunner at the University of Bern. From 1967 to 1972, he studied composition with Klaus Huber at the City of Basel Music Academy and in 1986/87 further studies with Gerald Bennett, Bruno Spoerri and Rainer Boesch at the Swiss Centre for Computer Music in Oetwil am See.

In 1969, he became a teacher of theory at the Winterthur Conservatory. Between 1970 and 2003, Schweizer taught composition and music theory at the Biel Conservatory. In 1981, he was the founder of the contemporary concert series "classic 2000" in Biel and in 1986 of the CD label of the same name.

His works have been performed at home and abroad, including in Germany and Eastern Europe and have been published by Müller & Schade.

Further reading 
 Schweizer, Alfred on ''Die Musik in Geschichte und Gegenwart

External links 
 
 
 Biographie, Werkliste und Diskographie von Alfred Schweizer in der Online-Datenbank musinfo.ch der Schweizer Musikedition

20th-century classical composers
Swiss music educators
1941 births
Living people
20th-century Swiss composers